Fighter Squadron 194 or VF-194 was a short-lived aviation unit of the United States Navy established on 1 December 1986 and disestablished on 30 April 1988. It was the fourth US Navy squadron to be designated VF-194.

Operational history

VF-194 adopted the unit name and insignia of the third VF-194. After training on the F-14A Tomcat with VF-124, and being due to deploy on board  as part of Carrier Air Wing 10, VF-191 was disestablished on 30 April 1988, before the cruise could take place.

In early 1992 the Navy planned to reactivate VF-194, along with VF-191, as the first two active F-14D Super-Tomcat squadrons. Initially planned to be based at NAS Miramar and part of Carrier Air Wing Fourteen, the idea was scrapped when Congress declined to upgrade the entire F-14 fleet to the D model and limited the F-14D purchase to 55 aircraft (28 new airframes and 27 re-manufactured F-14A airframes). Instead two east coast F-14A squadrons (VFA-11 and VF-31) were chosen to transition to the F-14D, CVW-14 and NAS Miramar in late 1992.

Home port assignments
NAS Moffett Field

Aircraft assignment
F-14A Tomcat

See also
History of the United States Navy
List of inactive United States Navy aircraft squadrons
List of United States Navy aircraft squadrons

References

External links

Strike fighter squadrons of the United States Navy